The Celtic International was a professional golf tournament held at Galway Golf Club in Salthill, Galway, Republic of Ireland in 1984. It was an event on the European Tour schedule.

It was a 72-hole pro-am stroke play tournament, and won by Scotland's Gordon Brand Jnr.

Winners

References

External links
Coverage on the European Tour's official site

Former European Tour events
Golf tournaments in the Republic of Ireland
Sport in County Galway
Golf in Connacht